A payaos is a type of fish aggregating device used in Southeast Asia, particularly in the Philippines.  Payaos were traditionally bamboo rafts for handline fishing before World War II, but modern steel payaos use fish lights and fish location sonar to increase yields.  While payaos fishing is sustainable on a small scale, the large scale, modern applications have been linked to adverse impacts on fish stocks.

Traditional payaos 
A traditional payaos is a simply constructed bamboo raft with a superstructure at or just below the waterline, most commonly constructed of palm fronds. Using hand-line fishing, fishermen take advantage of pelagic fish's attraction to floating objects.  Large tuna can be caught in this manner at depths of under 300 meters, far shallower than by contemporary methods like purse seining. Before World War II anchored and drifting payaos were deployed in all Philippines regional
waters barring the east, where strong currents prohibited it. Payaos are frequently anchored in the coastal waters, passively fishing for migrating fish.

The chronic overfishing of regional Philippine waters, combined with the low impact of shallow-water payaos fishing, has led to the establishment of the Tuna Productivity Project in Davao Gulf.  This will encourage traditional and environmentally sound fishing, and aims to decrease the catch of juvenile fish.

Modern payaos 
The traditional payaos has been adapted to meet the demand for commercially sized catches.  They are now commonly used in conjunction with purse seiners, pump boats, and gillnet fishing.  The success of these methods has greatly increased the pressure on fish stocks.  The use of lighted payaos to attract fish has also had a large impact on catch size and profitability, and by the 1980s over 2,000 commercial payaos were being used in the Moro Gulf alone.  By this time most other South Pacific nations had payaos programs and were seeking to improve their designs for increased durability for use in open ocean environments.  In particular, the drifting payaos using seines, as well as the lighted anchored payaos, catch juvenile tuna and byproduct fish, thereby affecting the lifecycle of the tuna beyond the simple loss of numbers from the catch.
 
No international policy has been set on the placement of payaos, and many are currently deployed in sea lanes, presenting a navigational hazard.  The replacement of bamboo with steel cages has also increased potential danger from collision and entanglement.

See also 
Aquaculture
Artificial reef
United Nations Convention on the Law of the Sea

References 

Fishing techniques and methods